The 1960 CFL season is considered to be the seventh season in modern-day Canadian football, although it is officially the third Canadian Football League season.

CFL News in 1960
The IRFU changed its name to become the Eastern Football Conference.

The CFL allowed unlimited blocking on interception returns.

The Calgary Stampeders moved into McMahon Stadium on Monday, August 15, after it took only 103 days to be built.

On September 14, four of the six directors of the Montreal Alouettes abruptly resigned their positions.  The resignations of Lucien Beauregard, Morgan N. Johnston, David C. McConnell and W. Heard Wert left only owner-president Ted Workman and general manager-coach Perry Moss on the board.

Rosters were reduced from 40 players to 34 on September 15.

Ottawa's Ron Stewart rushed for 287 yards on 16 carries in a game in Montreal against the Alouettes on Monday, October 10.  He rushed for four touchdowns, one in each quarter, on runs of 39, 51, 51 and 37 yards.  He broke the single-game record of 217 yards held previously by Hamilton's Gerry McDougall.

The Winnipeg Blue Bombers honoured their 11-year veteran guard with "Buddy Tinsley Night" at half-time during their Thursday, October 13, 1960, game versus the BC Lions.  The Winnipeg crowd of 16,773 was delighted when Tinsley lined up at fullback and took a hand-off from quarterback Kenny Ploen over from the BC one-yard line for a touchdown late in the fourth quarter.

At league meetings during Grey Cup week, Western teams dropped their insistence on sharing in the lucrative television rights payments received by the Big Four (Eastern) teams as a condition of accepting an interlocking schedule.  It was agreed to begin a partially interlocking schedule in 1961, with travel costs to be offset by an across-the-board surcharge of 25 cents on the price of every ticket sold (each team, every seat, every game).

1960 Preseason 
The CFL played an unbalanced schedule of Exhibition games.

Four teams (Ottawa, Toronto, Winnipeg and Hamilton) played their annual split-squad scrimmages at the conclusion of their preliminary training camps.

25 players received skin burns during an Edmonton–Calgary game played at Mewata Stadium in Calgary on July 20.  Two Eskimos, Roger Nelson and Jim Shipka, were treated in a Calgary hospital.  Two Stampeders, Doug Brown and Ernest Warlick, filed damage claims with the City of Calgary.  The lime used for field markings initially was suspected as being the cause, although laboratory tests later determined it was fully hydrated and should not have been the culprit.  Fertilizer also was suggested as a possible cause of the skin burns.

On July 28, the Saskatchewan Roughriders played the London Lords of the Senior Ontario Rugby Football Union in London, Ontario, and beat their hosts 38–0.

On July 29, the BC Lions played the Winnipeg Blue Bombers in Cedar Rapids, Iowa.  Part of the local appeal was the presence on three former University of Iowa stars, Kenny Ploen and Ray Jauch of the Blue Bombers, and Willie Fleming of the BC Lions.

After playing (and losing to) the NFL Chicago Cardinals in 1959, the Toronto Argonauts hosted the NFL Pittsburgh Steelers at CNE Stadium on August 3 and lost 43–16.  Both teams used 12 players, with a handful of NFL rules (blocking, punt returns) blended into the Canadian game.

Toronto also played host to an NFL exhibition game between the Chicago Bears and the New York Giants, at Varsity Stadium on Monday, August 15.  Top ticket price was $10, which was the most ever charged for a non-Grey Cup game in Toronto.  George Halas of the Bears, who also served as chairman of the NFL's expansion committee, admitted that in 1961 the NFL would have 14 teams, an awkward number, and that 16 teams would be more convenient for scheduling.  It was suggested that this game was a trial balloon for a possible expansion team in Toronto.  Chicago defeated the Giants by a 16–7 score, but the paid attendance was only 5,401, handing the promoters a $30,000 loss and effectively ending any chance of an NFL team north of the border.

1960 regular season 
Coaching Changes

Calgary
Fri 19 August – Otis Douglas resigns as head coach of the Calgary Stampeders, after the club started the season with a tie and two losses.  General Manager Jim Finks acts as co-ordinator of coaches for Calgary's August 22 game versus the BC Lions (a loss).
Tue 23 August – Steve Owen is appointed head coach for the remainder of the 1960 season.

General Manager Changes

Edmonton
Sat 10 September – Keith Rolfe resigns as General Manager of the Edmonton Eskimos, to take a position with an oil company in Calgary.  Joe Ryan, formerly with the Toronto Argonauts, is named as his successor.

Regular-season standings

Final regular season standings
Note: GP = Games Played, W = Wins, L = Losses, T = Ties, PF = Points For, PA = Points Against, Pts = Points

Bold text means that they have clinched the playoffs.
 Winnipeg and Toronto have first round byes.

Grey Cup playoffs
Note: All dates in 1960

Conference Semi-Finals

Conference finals

Playoff bracket

Grey Cup Championship

CFL Leaders
 CFL Passing Leaders
 CFL Rushing Leaders
 CFL Receiving Leaders

1960 Eastern All-Stars

Offence
QB – Sam Etcheverry, Montreal Alouettes
RB – Cookie Gilchrist, Toronto Argonauts
RB – Dave Thelen, Ottawa Rough Riders
RB – Ron Stewart, Ottawa Rough Riders
E  – Hal Patterson, Montreal Alouettes
E  – Paul Dekker, Hamilton Tiger-Cats
F – Dave Mann, Toronto Argonauts
C  – Norm Stoneburgh, Toronto Argonauts
OG – Jackie Simpson, Montreal Alouettes
OG – Kaye Vaughan, Ottawa Rough Riders
OT – Bill Hudson, Montreal Alouettes
OT – John Barrow, Hamilton Tiger-Cats

Defence
DT – Angelo Mosca, Ottawa Rough Riders
DT – John Barrow, Hamilton Tiger-Cats
DE – Lou Bruce, Ottawa Rough Riders
DE – Dick Fouts, Toronto Argonauts
DG – Marty Martinello, Toronto Argonauts
LB – Gary Schreider, Ottawa Rough Riders
LB – Cookie Gilchrist, Toronto Argonauts
LB – Jim Andreotti, Toronto Argonauts
LB – Gerald Nesbitt, Ottawa Rough Riders
DB – Jim Rountree, Toronto Argonauts
DB – Joe Poirier, Ottawa Rough Riders
S  – Stan Wallace, Toronto Argonauts

1960 Western All-Stars

Offence
QB – Jackie Parker, Edmonton Eskimos
RB – Willie Fleming, British Columbia Lions
RB – Earl Lunsford, Calgary Stampeders
RB – Leo Lewis, Winnipeg Blue Bombers
RB – Johnny Bright, Edmonton Eskimos
E  – Ernie Pitts, Winnipeg Blue Bombers
E  – Ernie Warlick, Calgary Stampeders
C  – Neil Habig, Saskatchewan Roughriders
OG – Cornel Piper, Winnipeg Blue Bombers
OG – Tony Pajaczkowski, Calgary Stampeders
OT – Frank Rigney, Winnipeg Blue Bombers
OT – Roger Nelson, Edmonton Eskimos

Defence
DT – Don Luzzi, Calgary Stampeders
DT – Urban Henry, British Columbia Lions
DE – Ed Gray, Edmonton Eskimos
DE – Herb Gray, Winnipeg Blue Bombers
MG – Ron Atchison, Saskatchewan Roughriders
LB – Gord Rowland, Winnipeg Blue Bombers
LB – Norm Fieldgate, British Columbia Lions
LB – Bill Burrell, Saskatchewan Roughriders
LB – David Burkholder, Winnipeg Blue Bombers
DB – Bill Smith, Edmonton Eskimos
DB – Clare Exelby, Calgary Stampeders
S  – Harvey Wylie, Calgary Stampeders

1960 CFL Awards
CFL's Most Outstanding Player Award – Jackie Parker (QB), Edmonton Eskimos
CFL's Most Outstanding Canadian Award – Ron Stewart (RB), Ottawa Rough Riders
CFL's Most Outstanding Lineman Award – Herb Gray (DE), Winnipeg Blue Bombers
 Jeff Russel Memorial Trophy (Eastern MVP) – Ron Stewart (RB), Ottawa Rough Riders
 Jeff Nicklin Memorial Trophy (WIFU MVP) – Jackie Parker (QB), Edmonton Eskimos
 Gruen Trophy (Eastern Rookie of the Year) – Bill Mitchell (G/LB), Toronto Argonauts
 DeMarco–Becket Memorial Trophy (WIFU Outstanding Lineman) – Frank Rigney (OT), Winnipeg Blue Bombers

1960 Miss Grey Cup
Miss Edmonton Eskimos Mary-Jo Powell was named Miss Grey Cup 1960

References 

Canadian Football League seasons
CFL